Sriram Chauhan (born 20 September 1953) is an Indian politician and member of the 18th Legislative Assembly of Uttar Pradesh representing Khajani constituency. He was the Minister of State, Parliamentary Affairs in 1999 and the Minister of State, Consumer Affairs, Food and Public Distribution from 1999 to 2001 in the Third Vajpayee ministry. He was elected as MP to 13th Lok Sabha from Basti in Uttar Pradesh. He was imprisoned in the emergency in 1975.

Personal life
Chauhan was born to Ram Naresh and Keshri Devi on 20 September 1953 in Khalilabad city of Basti district (now in Sant Kabir Nagar district) of Uttar Pradesh. He is a post-graduate and was educated at Kisan Snatakottar Mahavidyalaya, Basti. Chauhan married Gainda Devi in October 1971, with whom he has two daughters and a son. He is an agriculturist by profession.

Political career
Chauhan has been a member of the 17th Legislative Assembly of Uttar Pradesh. Since 2017, he has represented the Dhanghata constituency and is a member of the Bhartiya Janata Party. He is a former Member of parliament from Basti (Lok Sabha constituency) three straight times.

In 2017 elections he defeated Samajwadi Party candidate Algoo Prasad by a margin of 16,909 votes.

He has been appointed Minister of State (Independent Charge) in Yogi Adityanath ministry on 21 August 2019.

In 2022 Uttar Pradesh Legislative Assembly election, Chauhan contested from Khajani constituency and defeated rival Rupawati Beldar of Samajwadi Party by 37,101 votes.

Posts held

References

1953 births
Living people
Lok Sabha members from Uttar Pradesh
India MPs 1999–2004
Uttar Pradesh MLAs 2017–2022
People from Basti district
India MPs 1996–1997
India MPs 1998–1999
Uttar Pradesh MLAs 2022–2027
Bharatiya Janata Party politicians from Uttar Pradesh